Joseph Shikokoti (born 8 August 1985) is a Kenyan footballer who plays for A.F.C. Leopards in the Kenyan Premier League and the Kenya national team as a centre back.

Shikokoti is noted for his great height. At six feet seven inches, he is easily one of the tallest footballers around.

Club career

A.F.C. Leopards
In January 2014, Shikokoti joined AFC Leopards for a record KSh.700,000/= He scored his first goal for Ingwe on 29 January in a 6–0 victory over the Green Commandoes of Kakamega High School in a warm up match.

In June 2014, Shikokoti scored the equaliser against former club Tusker in the Meru Cup final after Lloyd Wahome had given Tusker the lead in the 12 minute.

International career
Shikokoti has played for the Kenya national team at both the 2010 FIFA World Cup qualifiers and the 2014 FIFA World Cup qualifiers.

References

External links
 
 

1985 births
Living people
Sportspeople from Mombasa
Association football central defenders
Kenyan footballers
Tusker F.C. players
A.F.C. Leopards players
Young Africans S.C. players
Kenyan Premier League players
Kenya international footballers
Kenyan expatriate footballers
Kenyan expatriate sportspeople in Tanzania
Expatriate footballers in Tanzania
Tanzanian Premier League players